Dennis Evans may refer to:

 Dennis Evans (footballer, born 1930) (1930–2000), English footballer who played for Arsenal
 Dennis Evans (footballer, born 1935), footballer who played for Wrexham and Tranmere Rovers
 Dennis F. Evans (1928–1990), English chemist

See also
 Denis Evans (born 1951), Australian scientist